"Ole Ola (Mulher Brasileira)" was a single released by the Scotland national football team in 1978, in collaboration with celebrity fan Rod Stewart.  It reached number 4 in the UK Singles Chart.

References

1978 singles
Football songs and chants
Scotland national football team songs
1978 songs
Scotland at the 1978 FIFA World Cup
Rod Stewart songs